Waseda University School of International Liberal Studies (SILS) is the 10th department established in 2004 under the Faculty of International Research and Education. The School of International Liberal Studies conducts all classes in English under the premise of multiculturalism, which is not limited to a certain language or culture. The students who speak Japanese follow Study Plan 1 (SP1) and those who speak other languages other than Japanese follow Study Plan 2 (SP2). The students from foreign institutes as exchange students follow Study Plan 3 (SP3). It is mandatory for the Study Plan 1 students to study abroad prior to their graduation. As of May 2015, there are 715 international students enrolled in the department, the most of any other department at Waseda.

Location
The School of International Liberal Studies was located at building 19 until 2009 when its new facility, building 11, was officially opened. The School of International Liberal Studies shares building 11 with the School of Commerce.

Global Five 
The Global Five refers to Japanese universities which enthusiastically focus on globalized mindset and strong English skills. The School of International Liberal Studies is one of the Global Five which includes International Christian University, Akita International University, Ritsumeikan Asia Pacific University and Sophia University's Faculty of Liberal Arts.

References

External links
School of International Liberal Studies homepage

Educational institutions established in 2004
Waseda University
Liberal arts colleges
2004 establishments in Japan